Emiko Nakano (1925–1990) was an American abstract expressionist painter, printmaker, fiber artist, and fashion Illustrator.

Biography 
Emiko Nakano was born on July 4, 1925, in Sacramento, California; her parents were immigrants from Japan. She was raised in Chico, California. When Nakano was in high school in 1939, the United States entered World War II. Following the signing of Executive Order 9066, her family was placed internment camp for three years because they were of Japanese ancestry; first at the Merced Assembly Center, followed by Camp Amache. When they were released from the camps, the family moved to Richmond, California.

From fall 1947 until the summer of 1951, Nakano attended the California School of Fine Arts (now known as San Francisco Art Institute). She studied with Clyfford Still, James Budd Dixon, Edward Corbett, Richard Diebenkorn, Hassel Smith, and Elmer Bischoff. In summer 1949, she attended the University of California, Berkeley; and in the summer 1952, she attended Mills College.

In the 1950s, Nakano worked as a freelance fashion illustrator. She died on March 7, 1990, at the age of 64, in Richmond, California. Her work is in the public museum collection at the Monterey Museum of Art.

Exhibitions 
A select list of exhibitions, by Nakano:

Solo exhibitions 
 2014–2015: Cross the Bridge: Emiko Nakano – Abstract Landscapes, Monterey Museum of Art, Monterey, California

Group exhibitions 
 1952: San Francisco Women Artists Annual Exhibition, San Francisco Museum of Art (now known as San Francisco Museum of Modern Art), San Francisco, California
 1952: American Drawings, Watercolors, and Prints, the Metropolitan Museum of Art, New York City, New York
1955: São Paulo Art Biennial, São Paulo, Brazil
 1955: Emiko Nakano and Clayton Pinkerton, Richmond Art Center, Richmond, California
 1955: Bay Region Painting and Sculpture, San Francisco Museum of Art (now known as San Francisco Museum of Modern Art), San Francisco, California

References 

1925 births
1990 deaths
20th-century American women artists
San Francisco Art Institute alumni
Abstract expressionist artists
People from Richmond, California
Artists from San Francisco
American women painters
American women printmakers
American people of Japanese descent
Japanese-American internees
American artists of Japanese descent
People from Chico, California